Carl Ludwig Oliver Haarmann (born September 1967) is a German private equity financier, and a founding partner of Searchlight Capital Partners.

Early life
Oliver Haarmann was born in September 1967. He earned a bachelor's degree in history and international relations from Brown University in 1990, and an MBA from Harvard Business School in 1996.

Career
Haarmann was managing director and partner at Kohlberg Kravis Roberts (KKR). In June 2007, The Daily Telegraph reported that only one of KKR's (then taking over Alliance Boots) eight London-based partners (not Haarmann) was tax-domiciled in the UK.

Searchlight Capital was established in 2010 by Eric Zinterhofer, Haarmann, and Erol Uzumeri, its founding partners.

Haarmann is a director of Ocean Outdoor  and Hunter Boot.

He is a trustee of Brown University, the Surgo Foundation , IntoUniversity, and Art Angel.

Personal life
Haarmann was married to fellow private equity businesswoman Mala Gaonkar. They have two sons.

References

Living people
1967 births
Brown University alumni
Harvard Business School alumni
Kohlberg Kravis Roberts